Leslie Ardon (born June 30, 1979 in Marseille) is a French basketball player who plays for club Union Lyon of the Ligue Féminine de Basketball the top league of basketball for Women, in France.

References

French women's basketball players
Sportspeople from Marseille
1979 births
Living people